This is a list of women artists who were born in Venezuela or whose artworks are closely associated with that country.

A
Esther Alzaibar
Carla Arocha (born 1961)

B
Lía Bermúdez (1930–2021), sculptor

C
Deborah Castillo (born 1971), performance artist

D
Katherine Di Turi

E
Patricia Esquivias (active since 2001), Venezuelan-born Spanish video artist
Marisol Escobar

F
Magdalena Fernández

G
Gego (1912–1994), abstract painter, sculptor
Elsa Gramcko (1925–1994), abstract painter, sculptor

H
Luchita Hurtado (1920–2020), Venezuelan-American painter

M
María Idilia Martins
Cristina Merchán (1927–1987), painter, ceramist
Faride Mereb
Daniella Isamit Morales (born 1982), performance artist

P
Mercedes Pardo (1921–2005), painter, printmaker, collage artist

R
Anrika Rupp (born 1956), artist
Luisa Richter

S
Seka Severin de Tudja (1923–2007), Yugoslavian-born Venezuelan ceramist
Rayma Suprani (active since 1990s), cartoonist, activist
Antonieta Sosa (born 1940), conceptual artist

T
Tecla Tofano (1927–1995), Italian-born Venezuelan ceramist, writer
María Teresa Torras

V
Patricia van Dalen (born 1955), painter, visual artist

Z
Geula Zylberman (born 1931), figurative painter
Elisa Elvira Zuloaga 
Maria Luisa Zuloaga de Tovar (1902–1992), ceramist

References

-
Venezuelan women artists, List of
Artists
Artists